Tommy Brooks (born June 6, 1954 in Knoxville, Tennessee) is a boxing trainer and a former boxer.  He is best known as the trainer of Evander Holyfield.

Amateur boxing career
As an amateur Brooks was the 1975 National AAU Middleweight champion.

Professional boxing career
Brooks turned pro and had a reported career record of 7-3.  After his boxing career he became a trainer.

Boxing Trainer

Among the boxers/boxing world champions who have trained under Brooks at some point of their career are:

 Evander Holyfield
 Mike Tyson
 Michael Grant
 Larry Donald
 Vitali Klitschko
 Wladimir Klitschko
 Vassiliy Jirov
 Mike McCallum
 Johnny Bumphus
 Meldrick Taylor
 Charles Murray
 Freddie Pendleton
 Rocky Lockridge
 Junior Jones
 Shaun George
 Yuri Foreman
 Tony Jeffries
 David Price

References

External links

Winners of the United States Championship for amateur boxers
American boxing trainers
Living people
1954 births
Sportspeople from Knoxville, Tennessee
Boxers from Tennessee
Light-heavyweight boxers
American male boxers
African-American boxers
21st-century African-American people
20th-century African-American sportspeople